Chicago, Illinois; 2,761,625
 Columbus, Ohio; 941,364
 Indianapolis, Indiana; 907,802
 Detroit, Michigan; 616,710
 Milwaukee, Wisconsin; 571,939
 Kansas City, Missouri; 522,580
 Omaha, Nebraska; 509,178
 Minneapolis, Minnesota; 444,168
 Wichita, Kansas; 402,080
 Cleveland, Ohio; 365,367
 St. Paul, Minnesota; 319,465
 Cincinnati, Ohio; 313,028
 Lincoln, Nebraska; 300,892
 St. Louis City, Missouri; 296,262
 Toledo, Ohio; 265,969
 Madison, Wisconsin; 280,829
 Fort Wayne, Indiana; 266,946
 Des Moines, Iowa; 217,343
 Grand Rapids, Michigan; 202,181
 Aurora, Illinois; 175,334
 Overland Park, Kansas; 197,106
 Akron, Ohio; 189,347
 Sioux Falls, South Dakota; 196,528
 Springfield, Missouri; 169,724
 Kansas City, Kansas; 508,394
 Rockford, Illinois; 147,711
 Joliet, Illinois; 150,371
 Naperville, Illinois; 149,104
 Dayton, Ohio; 137,571
 Warren, Michigan; 138,130
 Olathe, Kansas; 143,014
 Sterling Heights, Michigan; 131,996
 Cedar Rapids, Iowa; 130,330
 Topeka, Kansas; 127,139
 Fargo, North Dakota; 125,804
 Rochester, Minnesota; 124,599
 Evansville, Indiana; 119,806
 Ann Arbor, Michigan; 119,303
 Columbia, Missouri; 118,620
 Independence, Missouri; 117,369
 Springfield, Illinois; 116,313
 Peoria, Illinois; 115,424
 Lansing, Michigan; 115,222
 Elgin, Illinois; 112,628
 Green Bay, Wisconsin; 104,796

Edited by: QuinnBrown23

References

Midwestern

United States demography-related lists